The Bradley Barn Sessions is a duet album released in 1994 by American country music artist George Jones.

Recording
The concept behind The Bradley Barn Sessions was to place Jones in the hands of traditionalist country producer Brian Ahern, record at Owen Bradley's legendary studios, compile a selection of the singer's greatest hits, and have him sing duets with not just some of the biggest names in country but also pop music as well.  Although the album – Jones' fourth for MCA – did not break the top twenty on Billboards country albums chart, peaking at 23, it features the first recorded duet between the singer and his ex-wife Tammy Wynette since their 1981 LP Together Again.  The only single release from the album was "A Good Year for the Roses", a collaboration with Alan Jackson.  As Jones noted in his autobiography two years later, "After the duets album was released, radio didn't know what to do with it...Alan was white-hot on the radio, and programmers wanted his voice.  But some didn't want his if they had to take mine.  The vast majority of Alan's other single records have gone to number one.  His duet with me was his first not to crack the top 50."  It actually peaked at number 57.  In June 1995, the song won the Music City News Country Awards "Vocal Collaboration of the Year".

In addition to a who's who of past and present country stars, the album boasted two significant contributors from outside the country music field.  The first was Mark Knopfler, primarily known as leader and guitarist for the rock band Dire Straits.  A big country fan who had recorded an album with Chet Atkins in 1990, Knopfler played guitar and sang background on a remake of Jones's first number one country hit from 1959, "White Lightning", and can be heard laughing as Jones hams it up on the vocal.  The other rock musician who sang with Jones was Keith Richards of the Rolling Stones on "Say It's Not You", which originally appeared on Jones's 1967 album If My Heart Had Windows.  In a 2004 interview that was posted on his website, Richards said of the meeting, "That was a great experience...To sing with George – and get away with it! – was amazing.  What a possum."  In a 1996 Rolling Stone interview Jones confessed to Chuck Dean, "I'll be honest with you: I love Keith Richards more than anything as a person.  He's a character – just fun to be around."  An hour-long documentary-style special was filmed in late 1994 to promote the duet album. It aired in 1995 on The Nashville Network.  Among the guests were the duet partners, Tony Brown, Brian Ahern, and Owen Bradley.

Several unreleased tracks recorded during this album's sessions were later included on Jones' 2008 duets album Burn Your Playhouse Down.

Reception
Stephen Thomas Erlewine of AllMusic calls The Bradley Barn Sessions "a stilted, nearly lifeless album. The production is too clean and polished, lacking any of the grit of true honky tonk records. Furthermore, songs like "A Good Year for the Roses" suffer from the stringless, stripped-down arrangements.

Track listing

Personnel
 Brian Ahern – rhythm guitar (track 1), bass (track 10), acoustic guitar (tracks 2, 5 – 7, 9, 11)
 Eddie Bayers – drums (tracks 1 – 3, 5, 7 – 10)
 Richard Bennett – acoustic guitar (tracks 1, 4, 6, and 11)
 James Burton – electric guitar (tracks 5 and 11)
 Jerry Douglas – resonator guitar (tracks 1 – 4, 8, and 9)
 Paul Franklin – steel guitar (tracks 5, 7, and 10)
 Vince Gill – guitar (tracks 4, 6, 7, and 10)
 Glen D. Hardin – piano (tracks 2, 3, 7 – 9)
 Emmylou Harris – acoustic guitar (track 5)
 Randy Howard – mandolin (track 11)
 John Hughey – steel guitar (tracks 4 and 6)
 David Hungate – bass (tracks 4, 6, and 11)
 John Jennings – electric guitar (tracks 3 and 9)
 Mark Knopfler – electric guitar (track 10)
 Mac McAnally – acoustic slide guitar (track 1), acoustic guitar (tracks 2, 3, 5, 7 – 10)
 Keith Richards – electric guitar (track 5)
 Hargus "Pig" Robbins – piano (tracks 1 and 10)
 Brent Rowan – electric guitar (tracks 2 and 8)
 Leon Russell – piano (tracks 4 – 6, 11)
 Ricky Skaggs – harmony vocals (tracks 4 and 8), fiddle (tracks 1, 2, 5 – 11), acoustic guitar (tracks 3 and 4)
 Tommy Spurlock – steel guitar (tracks 2, 3, 8, 9, and 11), resonator guitar (track 7)
 Harry Stinson – drums (tracks 4, 6, and 11)
 Marty Stuart – electric slide guitar (track 1), mandolin (tracks: 2 – 10)
 Glenn Worf – acoustic guitar (track 3), acoustic bass  (tracks 1, 2, 5, 7–10)

1994 albums
George Jones albums
MCA Records albums
Vocal duet albums
Albums produced by Brian Ahern (producer)